Calonotos tiburtus is a moth of the subfamily Arctiinae. It was described by Pieter Cramer in 1779. It is found in Costa Rica, Panama, Guyana and Suriname.

References

Arctiinae
Moths described in 1779